The 2008 San Marino and Rimini Riviera motorcycle Grand Prix was the thirteenth round of the 2008 MotoGP Championship. It took place on the weekend of 29–31 August 2008 at the Misano World Circuit.

MotoGP classification

250 cc classification

125 cc classification

Championship standings after the race (MotoGP)

Below are the standings for the top five riders and constructors after round thirteen has concluded. 

Riders' Championship standings

Constructors' Championship standings

 Note: Only the top five positions are included for both sets of standings.

References

San Marino and Rimini Riviera motorcycle Grand Prix
San Marino
San Marino and Rimini